Sebukht was a 6th-century ambassador of the Sasanian King of Kings (shahanshah) Khosrow I. Seemingly a Christian, Sebukht was sent to the Byzantine capital of Constantinople in 572 to collect the annual payment of 500 pounds of gold which was part of the terms of the Fifty-Year Peace Treaty of 562. He was, however, dismissed by emperor Justin II, who sent his general Marcian against the Sasanians, thus initiating the Byzantine–Sasanian War of 572–591.

References

Sources 
 

Christians in the Sasanian Empire
Diplomats of the Sasanian Empire
6th-century diplomats
Ambassadors to the Byzantine Empire